Marty may refer to:

Names
 Marty (given name), including a list of people and fictional characters, also includes stage names
 Marty (surname), a list of people

Places in the United States
 Marty, California, a former settlement
 Marty, Minnesota, an unincorporated community
 Marty, South Dakota, a census-designated place

Arts and entertainment
 "Marty" (teleplay), a 1953 teleplay by Paddy Chayefsky
 Marty (film), a 1955 American film based on the teleplay
 Marty (musical), a 2003 musical version of the film
 Marty (TV series), a 1968–1969 British television comedy series starring Marty Feldman
 "Marty", a song by the band Five Iron Frenzy

Other uses
 Tropical Storm Marty (disambiguation), various storms and hurricanes
 , a patrol vessel in United States Navy service from 1917 to 1918
 FM Towns Marty, a Japanese videogame console
 "Marty", a robotic supermarket assistant used by The Giant Company

See also

Martí (disambiguation)